Ennis is an unincorporated community located in Muhlenberg County, Kentucky, United States.

References

Unincorporated communities in Muhlenberg County, Kentucky
Unincorporated communities in Kentucky